JLA Adventures: Trapped in Time is a 2014 American animated superhero film featuring the Justice League of America. It was first released on January 21, 2014 on DVD, and features Diedrich Bader, Travis Willingham, and Kevin Michael Richardson, reprising their roles as Batman, Gorilla Grodd, and Black Manta respectively.

Plot
In the present day, Lex Luthor and his Legion of Doom try to use cryogenic rays from orbital satellites to expand the Earth's polar ice caps in the Arctic Ocean, causing a massive drop in sea levels and creating new islands they intend to rule. Superman and the Justice League confront the Legion, dividing their forces to fight the Legion and destroy the satellites. In the ensuing space battle, Robin purposely crashes Batman's Batwing jet into the satellite array. Refusing to accept defeat, Captain Cold overloads the remaining satellite, which falls back to Earth and entombs Luthor in an ice sheet shortly before the satellite explodes. The League is triumphant and believes Luthor to be dead.

In the utopian future of the 31st century, teenage superheroes-in-training Dawnstar and Karate Kid are visiting a museum dedicated to the exploits of the Justice League. They find that Luthor has been in suspended animation for nearly a millennium after being discovered and excavated in the 29th century and placed on display. Karate Kid accidentally releases Luthor from the ice. Luthor awakes nearly 1,000 years into the future; he explores the museum, discovers Superman's secret identity and locates an ancient item called the Eternity Glass, which allows its user to manipulate the fabric of time and space. Taking Captain Cold's weapon, he freezes Dawnstar and Karate Kid. He then uses the Eternity Glass to unleash Time Trapper as his servant, allowing him to travel to the point when he last fought the League. Vengeful, Luthor plans to return and destroy Superman. The young heroes break free and follow.

Resuming control of the Legion, Luthor instructs Time Trapper to send his forces back in time to prevent the Kent family from adopting Kal-El in Smallville. The young heroes enlist the Justice League's aid to stop them, and travel to the Hall of Justice in Washington, D.C. After a misunderstanding, they explain their story and verify its validity through Wonder Woman's Lasso of Truth. The Flash, Aquaman, and Cyborg travel into the past to prevent Bizarro, Toyman, Cheetah, and Solomon Grundy from sending the baby Kal-El back into space, while Superman and the rest of the League attempt to stall Luthor's Legion in the present.

Despite the Justice League's efforts, the Legion sends Kal-El's ship away from Earth. Without Superman, there is nobody left in the past to inspire individuals with extraordinary abilities to become superheroes. This causes a temporal paradox, enabling Time Trapper to erase the Justice League in the present. Unwilling to risk being erased from existence, Dawnstar and Karate Kid retreat. In the absence of the Justice League, the Legion pillages the world, robbing banks and depositories, and leaving Washington D.C. in ruins. The young heroes realize that they can induce their own paradox by ensuring Lex Luthor's past counterpart never traveled to the 31st century so he could not steal the Eternity Glass and return to the past. The young heroes discover Luthor's confinement with Dawnstar's tracking ability, where Karate Kid breaks the ice and frees Luthor's earlier self.
 
The Time Trapper banishes the future Luthor from existence and tries to remake the current world in his image. Superman and the Justice League, who exist again because of the latter's absence, confront the villain. Time Trapper is too powerful for the League to fight. Karate Kid discovers that Time Trapper is composed entirely of dark matter. Karate Kid realizes that only Dawnstar's light-based powers can defeat Time Trapper. Dawnstar charges Time Trapper and the League defeat him, reverting the Eternity Glass, which imprisons Time Trapper once more. The Justice League thanks the young heroes and offers them the opportunity to stay. Karate Kid and Dawnstar decline, stating they must return to their time. They use the Eternity Glass to return to the 31st century. Superman recovers Luthor and sends him to Blackgate Prison. Gorilla Grodd assumes control of the Legion of Doom. Returning to their own time, Karate Kid and Dawnstar discover that a statue of Luthor has replaced a statue of Superman. Believing they have altered history in some unforeseen fashion, they immediately return to the 21st century to help the Justice League once more.

Cast

 Diedrich Bader as Batman
 Laura Bailey as Dawnstar 
 Dante Basco as Karate Kid
 Corey Burton as Time Trapper, Captain Cold
 Grey DeLisle-Griffin as Wonder Woman, Superbaby
 Peter Jessop as Superman
 Fred Tatasciore as Lex Luthor
 Jack DeSena as Robin
 Michael David Donovan as Bizarro
 Tom Gibis as Toyman, Jonathan Kent 
 Erica Luttrell as Cheetah, Martha Kent
 Liam O'Brien as Aquaman, Batwing Computer
 Kevin Michael Richardson as Black Manta, Solomon Grundy
 Jason Spisak as Flash, Taxi Driver
 Avery Waddell as Cyborg
 Travis Willingham as Gorilla Grodd

Release
The film was first released on DVD exclusively at Target stores on January 21, 2014. The DVD, and digital download, was later available generally on May 20 the same year.

Reception

Chris Sims of comicsalliance.com wrote, "Trapped In Time might not have the pedigree of being inspired by a best-selling comic, but it’s exactly the kind of project DC’s animated movies should be focusing on". Cliff Wheatley from IGN gave the film 8/10, saying "JLA Adventures: Trapped in Time is a call back to the glory days of DC’s animated offerings. It might not have the refined animation of the Bruce Timm era, but it’s certainly a ton of fun despite its flaws".

References

External links 

 

2010s American animated films
2010s direct-to-video animated superhero films
2014 direct-to-video films
2014 films
2010s animated superhero films
2014 animated films
American children's animated adventure films
American children's animated science fantasy films
American children's animated superhero films
American fantasy adventure films
Animated Justice League films
Cryonics in fiction
Direct-to-video animated films based on DC Comics
Films scored by Frederik Wiedmann
Films set in the 21st century
Films set in the 31st century
Films set in Washington, D.C.
Target Corporation
Animated films about time travel
Films directed by Giancarlo Volpe
2010s English-language films